Brady Run is a tributary of the Beaver River in western Pennsylvania.  The stream rises in central Beaver County then flows southeast entering the Beaver River at Fallston, Pennsylvania. The watershed is roughly 21% agricultural, 61% forested and the rest is other uses.

References

Rivers of Pennsylvania
Tributaries of the Beaver River
Rivers of Beaver County, Pennsylvania